

Intro

Beulah Baptist Church is a predominantly Black Baptist Church at 320 S. Washington Street in Old Town Alexandria, Virginia. The historic building is a two-story brick structure with a gable roof and large stained glass window. Built in 1863, it was located on the edge of the historic Black neighborhood of ‘the Bottoms’. The church was added to the National Register of Historic Places in 2004.  

Beulah was the first of ten Black churches established in Alexandria following the town's occupation by Union troops in 1861. The church's first pastor, Rev. Clem Robinson, had established "The First Select Colored School" in 1861 for Contraband refugees arriving in Alexandria. The following year Robinson, together with Dye Carter, selected a parcel on South Washington Street to build their new church, and Carter oversaw construction of the building. The contraband school soon moved to that location and continued operating after the war. Today Beulah Baptist Church remains a vibrant church community in Alexandria Old Town, continuing to worship in their historic building on S. Washington St.

History
Rev. Clem Robinson had been born in Brunswick County, Virginia, but moved to Pennsylvania where he received both a collegiate and religious education at Ashmun Institute (now Lincoln University) and began a teaching career. It had been against the law in Virginia since the 1830's to educate Black Americans, both enslaved and free. It was also forbidden for educated African Americans to come into the state. It was not until Alexandria’s occupation by Federal troops at the start of the Civil War in May 1861, that Robinson felt it was safe to return to Virginia. At that time Alexandria was being overwhelmed with contraband refugees fleeing slavery in the Confederacy.  

With support from the American Baptist Free Mission Society of New York and the (Northern) American Baptist Home Mission Society, Rev. Robinson and his wife came to Alexandria and worked with Rev. George Washington Parker and Miss Amanda Borden to found several schools for contraband refugees. One of these, "The First Select Colored School," served over 700 students in its first year. Other schools which they founded included a night school for adults and a "Normal and Theological Institute" for those with some education. These schools preceded the federal schools, set up by the Freedman's Bureau, by many months.

In the early days, Rev. Robinson taught upper-level students at the "Beulah Normal and Theological Institute" with the aim of educating future teachers and preachers for the Black community. Classes met at the church and had over 80 students in the first few years, both men and women.  The school placed over 30 missionaries and educators into the field.  Robinson and Parker also assisted the efforts of other pioneers for Black education in Alexandria, including Harriet Jacobs and Julia Wilbur. Robinson's school remained in place until 1870, when Alexandria opened its public school system. 

In addition to its role in educating recently freed African Americans, Beulah Baptist provided a supportive environment as the contraband refugees adjusted to their new life in freedom with shelter, work, and clothing. 

As the Civil War continued, the church building was used as a hospital to care for the wounded in this city on the front lines of the war. And when the federal government conﬁscated all lands within the Confederate states (including Virginia), Beulah Baptist saw both its property and its new church building seized and returned to the previous owner. In 1877 Rev. Robinson and the officers were able to repurchase the property for their congregation.  

Reverend Clem Robinson served for twelve years, his pastorate was ended in 1875. From 1875 to 2017, twelve other men would take the helm as pastor of the Beulah Baptist Church. The longest-tenured pastor of the church has been Rev. Dr. Columbus Watson who ushered the church into the 21st century and served at Beulah Baptist for 58 years (56 years as Pastor) until his retirement on September 30, 2017. Beulah Baptist is currently pastored by Rev. Quardricos Bernard Driskell.

Building
Built in 1863, Beulah Baptist Church is a front gable-roofed, freestanding brick structure located on South Washington Street, a main thoroughfare in the city. It is one of several significant historic churches on adjacent blocks. The two-story structure's most distinctive features include a large stained-glass window centered on the front facade, large ﬂanking recessed brick panels, and two small decorative brick pinnacles at each corner of the facade.

According to church history, the addition to the rear of the church was built between 1920 and 1923. Further improvements were undertaken in the following decades. The back of the church was rebuilt and the first electric lighting system was installed. A Hook and Hastings pipe organ, which had been given to Beulah by Christ Church Episcopal just up the street, was installed. This organ is still at the church today.

In 1949 the wall on the north side of the church was damaged, however while in the midst of repairing it the south wall fell. Having to move out for repairs, worship services were initially held at the Elk’s Home and later at the Seventh Day Adventist Church. Other church programs were held at the First Baptist Church and Third Baptist Church until the basement of the church was reopened in September 1950. The sanctuary was completed in November 1950 and a “Rebuilding Stone” was laid.  These repairs are still clearly visible in the different brick colors on the exterior side walls of the church.

Notes

References

See also
 Beulah Baptist Church

 Baptist Church One Hundred Thirtieth Anniversary (October 22, 1993).

 National Register of Historic Places listings in Alexandria, Virginia

Churches completed in 1863
19th-century Baptist churches in the United States
African-American historic places
Baptist churches in Virginia
Churches in Alexandria, Virginia
Churches on the National Register of Historic Places in Virginia
National Register of Historic Places in Alexandria, Virginia